Mike Fladell (born October 5, 1985) is a former American football offensive tackle. He was signed by the New York Giants as an undrafted free agent in 2008. He played college football at Rutgers.  Fladell has also been a member of the New York Jets, New York Sentinels and Omaha Nighthawks.

External links
Just Sports Stats

1985 births
Living people
American football offensive tackles
American football offensive guards
Rutgers Scarlet Knights football players
New York Giants players
New York Jets players
New York Sentinels players
Omaha Nighthawks players
Sportspeople from Queens, New York
Players of American football from New York City
Jewish American sportspeople
21st-century American Jews